Acleris elegans is a species of moth of the family Tortricidae. It is found in Japan (Hokkaido).

The wingspan is 14–16 mm.

The larvae feed on Populus species.

References

Moths described in 1956
elegans
Moths of Japan